The Jenkins Orphanage, now officially known as the Jenkins Institute For Children, was established in 1891 by Rev. Daniel Joseph Jenkins in Charleston, South Carolina. Jenkins was a businessman and Baptist minister who encountered street children and decided to organize an orphanage for young African Americans.

The original site of the orphanage was 660 King Street, but the number of orphans  quickly outpaced the facilities. In 1893, the orphanage moved to the Old Marine Hospital at 20 Franklin Street. This National Historic Landmark, designed by Robert Mills, served as home of the orphanage until 1937.  Its present-day location is in North Charleston, South Carolina.

Jenkins Orphanage Bands

The orphanage took in donations of musical instruments and Jenkins hired two local Charleston musicians — P.M. "Hatsie" Logan and Francis Eugene Mikell — to tutor the children in music. Upon its establishment, it became the only black instrumental group organized in South Carolina. The band's debut was on the streets of Charleston with the permission of the mayor, police chief, and Chamber of Commerce. The Jenkins Orphanage Band, wearing discarded Citadel uniforms, performed throughout the United States and even toured England raising money for the support of the orphanage. It played in inaugural parades of Presidents Theodore Roosevelt and William Taft. It appeared at the St. Louis Exposition and the Anglo-American Exposition in 1914. It toured the United States from coast to coast, and played in Paris, Berlin, Rome, London, and Vienna. As many as five bands were on tour during the 1920s. The band ceased to exist in the 1980s.

The orphanage published the Charleston Messenger newspaper.

In 2003, a 10-minute Fox Movietone News newsreel feature about the band, filmed on November 22, 1928, was selected for preservation in the National Film Registry by the Library of Congress, being deemed "culturally, historically, or aesthetically significant".

William "Cat" Anderson, Jabbo Smith, Tom Delaney, and Freddie Green are notable alumni.

References

Bibliography
 John Chilton (1980) A Jazz Nursery: The Story of the Jenkins' Orphanage Bands of Charleston, South Carolina, 60 p., London, U.K.: Bloomsbury, .

External links

Fox Movietone News: Jenkins Orphanage Band essay by Julie Hubbert at National Film Registry 
Fox Movietone News: Jenkins Orphanage Band essay by Daniel Eagan in America's Film Legacy: The Authoritative Guide to the Landmark Movies in the National Film Registry, A&C Black, 2010 , pages 153-155 
Jenkins Institute For Children
Avery Research Center
University of South Carolina Archives
Time Magazine
The Charleston Jazz Initiative
South Carolina Music Hall of Fame
Charleston Jazz by Jack McCray

 Excerpt of Fox Movietone News: Jenkins Orphanage Band at the South Carolina University Libraries Moving Image Research Collections

African-American history in Charleston, South Carolina
Orphanages in the United States
Buildings and structures in Charleston, South Carolina